The Ailefroide (3,954 m) is a mountain in the Massif des Écrins in the French Alps, and is the third highest peak in the Dauphiné Alps after the Barre des Écrins and La Meije. It lies at the south-western end of the Mont Pelvoux–Pic Sans Nom–Ailefroide ridge.

There are three main summits on the mountain:

L'Ailefroide Occidentale (3,954 m): first ascent by W. A. B. Coolidge with guides Christian Almer and Ulrich Almer on 7 July 1870
L'Ailefroide Centrale (3,928 m): first ascent by Auguste Reynier, Pierre Gaspard (father), Christophe Clot and Joseph Turc on 8 August 1889
L'Ailefroide Orientale (3,848 m): first ascent by J. Nérot, Emile Pic and Giraud-Lézin on 25 August 1880

See also

List of mountains of the Alps above 3000 m

External links
 The Ailefroide on SummitPost

Alpine three-thousanders
Mountains of the Alps
Mountains of Hautes-Alpes
Mountains of Isère